Upperco is an unincorporated community in Baltimore and Carroll counties, Maryland, United States.

Notable person
 Ben Carson, surgeon and politician

References

Unincorporated communities in Baltimore County, Maryland
Unincorporated communities in Maryland